Air Serbia (stylised as AirSERBIA) is the flag carrier of Serbia. The company's headquarters is located in Belgrade, Serbia, and its main hub is Belgrade Nikola Tesla Airport. The airline was known as Jat Airways until it was renamed and rebranded in 2013.

History

Origins

Air Serbia originated in 1927 when the first Serbian company for civil air transport Aeroput was formed. 1927 was also the year the nation's capital Belgrade became the hub of its operations, with the inauguration of an international airport. Aeroput became the flag carrier of the Kingdom of Yugoslavia and, by the opening of numerous airfields throughout the country, significantly improved connections between the various regions. Besides providing passenger, mail, and cargo service to its domestic destinations, Aeroput inaugurated its first regular scheduled international route, Belgrade–Zagreb–Graz–Vienna, in 1929. During the 1930s, it expanded by opening new routes to other destinations in Austria, Czechoslovakia, Hungary, Romania, Bulgaria, Greece, Turkey, Albania, and Italy. These new routes helped it position itself as a major regional airliner. Its fleet consisted in one Aeroput MMS-3, one Breguet 19/10, two Caudron C.449 Goéland, one De Havilland DH.80A Puss Moth, one De Havilland DH.60M Moth, one De Havilland DH.83 Fox Moth, one De Havilland DH.89 Dragon Rapide, one Farman F.190, one Farman F.306, eight Lockheed Model 10 Electra, six Potez 29/2 and three Spartan Cruiser II, one of which was built under licence by the domestic Zmaj aircraft factory.

After WWII, the company was nationalized and rebranded as JAT Jugoslovenski Aerotransport in 1948, thus becoming the flag carrier of the FPR Yugoslavia. Despite being a communist country, Yugoslavia broke relations with the Soviet Union and became a cofounder of the Non-Aligned Movement. As a result, its fleet consisted almost entirely of Western-built aircraft. The carrier entered the jet age in 1963 with the acquisition of the Sud Aviation Caravelle, followed by the McDonnell Douglas DC-9 in 1969, the Boeing 707 in 1970, the McDonnell Douglas DC-10 in 1971, and the Boeing 727 in 1974. By the 1980s, JAT operated regular flights to all the continents except South America, which was planned for commencement by the 1990s. In 1985 JAT became the first European operator of the Boeing 737-300, and introduced the ATR 42 and ATR 72 in 1987 for its regional and domestic routes. According to IATA in 1988, JAT was the tenth largest airline in Europe by flying to 76 destinations in 39 countries, which included long-haul flights to Los Angeles, Chicago, Detroit, Cleveland, New York, Montreal, and Toronto in the west, and Beijing, Calcutta, Kuala Lumpur, Singapore, Melbourne and Sydney in the east. Its fleet modernization plan began in the 1980s with the introduction of the Boeing 737, while its long-range DC-10s were scheduled to be replaced by either the Boeing 767-ER, the McDonnell Douglas MD-11 or the Airbus A340. However, its modernization plan was never realized due to the start of the Yugoslav wars. During the 1980s, JAT also established a maintenance hangar in Belgrade and a pilot-training academy in Belgrade and Vršac.

The continual growth of the company was disrupted by the breakup of Yugoslavia in the early 1990s. JAT became a public company on 29 February 1992 and continued its role as the flag carrier of the FR Yugoslavia.

Development since the 2000s

In 2003, the country was renamed Serbia and Montenegro, and that same year the company was renamed Jat Airways. In 2006, Montenegro declared independence and Jat Airways became the flag carrier of Serbia. An aging fleet and lack of investment made the airline unprofitable. So the Serbian government sought for a strategic partner for the company.

On 1 August 2013, Jat Airways and Etihad Airways entered into a strategic partnership agreement under which Etihad would acquire a 49% interest in Jat Airways and its management rights for five years. The Republic of Serbia would retain a controlling interest of 51% and hold five of nine monitoring committee seats in the company. Jat Airways was then reorganized and renamed Air Serbia in October 2013. It launched its inaugural flight from Belgrade to Abu Dhabi on 26 October 2013.

On 23 June 2016, Air Serbia's non-stop flights between Belgrade and New York commenced using an Airbus A330-200 leased from Etihad partner, Jet Airways. This transatlantic service became the first non-stop flight operated by a former Yugoslav carrier into the United States since 1992, when all of JAT's long-haul flights were suspended.

Air Serbia implemented an extensive restructuring plan in mid-2017 to improve its performance. The goal was to focus on net profit, a new fare structure, new sales channels, and offer additional services that would increase efficiency. From May to June 2017, it retrofitted its Airbus A319 and A320 fleet with Recaro BL3520 seats to standardize its seating plan. This resulted in a seating capacity increase of 12%. On 24 January 2018, the carrier announced the introduction of a new pricing model that would create four fare types in an effort to unbundle its fares. Passengers can choose from four fare types, with each fare type determining luggage allowance, priority boarding, fast track through the airport, travel date changes, and other entitlements.

On 1 March 2018, Air Serbia opened the Elevate Deli & Bar service on its short and medium-haul flights to give passengers the option to purchase food and drinks on the flight. This service replaced its previous inflight catering and offers one of two menus based on flight length and type of aircraft operating the route. Inflight catering on its long-haul, transatlantic service remains unchanged, with passengers receiving a free meal.

In 2021 the company was awarded the Order of Karađorđe's Star.

Since Serbia did not impose sanctions on Russia following the 2022 Russian invasion of Ukraine, the airline continues to operate regular flights to the country, creating a loophole for Russian citizens to fly to Europe. As a result, the airline has faced dozens of bomb threats which airline officials have attributed to foreign intelligence agencies seeking to disrupt its flights to Russia. In April 2022, it was reported that a NATO military aircraft had trailed an Air Serbia flight as it left Russian airspace.

Corporate affairs

Ownership structure
Originally, Air Serbia was jointly owned by the Government of Serbia, which held a 51 percent share interest, and Etihad Airways, which owned a 49 percent share interest and management control. On 30 December 2020, the Government of Serbia purchased 31% from Etihad, and thus currently holds 82% share interest.

Business trends
Air Serbia's key performance indicators are (years ending December 31):

Subsidiaries

Aviolet

In May 2014, Air Serbia launched their now-defunct charter brand, Aviolet (Serbian Cyrillic: Авиолет), using a fleet of three Boeing 737-300s under Air Serbia's IATA airline code (JU). The majority of Aviolet charter flights were operated during the peak holiday season, which runs from June to September. The first Aviolet-branded flight took off from Belgrade on 4 May 2014, flying to Antalya. As of 2021, Aviolet is defunct as the charter operations were taken over by Air Serbia itself.

Air Serbia Ground Services
Formerly known as SU-Port, Air Serbia Ground Services (ASGS) was the official provider of aircraft ground handling services in the Republic of Serbia, being certified by Serbia's Civil Aviation Directorate. ASGS provided ground handling operations to passengers, baggage, aircraft, cargo, and mail. Since its founding in 2002, the company handled more than two million passengers and 8500 flights for Air Serbia and other airlines annually. It was discontinued in November 2017, and all employees were transferred to Belgrade Airport.

Air Serbia Catering
Air Serbia Catering (ASC) is a wholly owned subsidiary of Air Serbia. Located near Nikola Tesla Airport, the company prepares and handles inflight meals for Air Serbia, as well as other carriers flying to and from Belgrade. Founded in 1967 as part of JAT, ASC has operated as an independent company since 2005 and became part of Air Serbia in 2014.

Destinations

Air Serbia operates flights to 80 destinations in 34 countries , including its hubs at Belgrade Nikola Tesla Airport and Niš Constantine the Great Airport.

Codeshare agreements
Air Serbia has codeshare agreements with the following airlines:

 Aegean Airlines
 Aeroflot
 Air China
 Air Europa
 Air France
 Air Seychelles
 airBaltic
 Bulgaria Air
 El Al
 Finnair
 ITA Airways
 KLM
 LOT Polish Airlines
 Luxair
 Qatar Airways
 Sky Express
 TAROM
 Turkish Airlines

Fleet

Current fleet
, Air Serbia's fleet is composed of the following aircraft:

Livery
Introduced in October 2013, Air Serbia's livery was created by graphic designer Tamara Maksimović. Featuring Serbia's national colours – red, blue, and white – the design, with its graphical elements and details, is based on Serbian medieval art. The carrier's logo, featured on the tail, is a stylized double-headed eagle inspired by the Serbian coat-of-arms. The carrier's name and logo can be seen on both the fuselage and belly of each aircraft.

In 2013 the airline launched the "Living Legends" initiative, which pays tribute to famous Serbian citizens who have made positive contributions to society, both in Serbia and abroad. In recognition of its success, Air Serbia names each aircraft after them. Such individuals include inventor and engineer Nikola Tesla, tennis superstar Novak Djokovic, former NBA player Vlade Divac, former footballer and manager Dejan Stanković, actor Miki Manojlović, and musician Goran Bregović.

Retired fleet
ATR 72-500

See also
 Transport in Serbia

References

Further reading

External links

 

 
Airlines established in 1927
Association of European Airlines members
Etihad Airways Partners
Government-owned airlines
Government-owned companies of Serbia
Companies based in Belgrade
Airlines of Serbia
Serbian brands
1927 establishments in Serbia